Nebojša Vidić (born 29 January 1973) is a Serbian professional basketball coach and former player.

Playing career 
As a guard, Vidić played for his hometown clubs Tamiš and Rolling-Hunter.

Coaching career 
Vidić started his coaching career at 22, while he was still an active player. He was a head coach for Tamiš and Sveti Đorđe during the 2000s.

In the 2011–12 season, Vidić was the head coach for Þór Akureyri of the Icelandic Premier League. In the 2013–14 season, Vidić was the head coach for Lokomotiv-Kuban 2 of the VTB United Youth League.

In February 2016, Bulgarian club Balkan Botevgrad hired Vidić as their new head coach. In June 2016, he signed with Balkan for the 2016–17 season. In May 2017, he signed with Balkan for one more season. Following a 3–1 win over Levski Lukoil in the 2019 Finals, Vidić won a Bulgarian National League for the 2018–19 season with Balkan. It was their first national title in 30 years. In May 2019, he left Balkan Botevgrad.

Prior to the 2019–20 season, Vidić became an assistant coach for Nizhny Novgorod under Zoran Lukić. On 10 March 2021, Tamiš hired him as their new head coach.

Career achievements 
 Bulgarian National League champion: 2 (with Balkan Botevgrad: 2018–19, 2021–22)

References

External links
 Nebojsa Vidic at realgm.com
 Nebojsa Vidic at eurobasket.com

1973 births
Living people
Guards (basketball)
BC Avtodor coaches
KK Tamiš coaches
KK Tamiš players
Sportspeople from Pančevo
Serbian men's basketball coaches
Serbian men's basketball players
Serbian expatriate basketball people in Bulgaria
Serbian expatriate basketball people in Iceland
Serbian expatriate basketball people in Russia